Creason is a surname. Notable people with the surname include:
Glen Creason, American librarian
Joe Creason (1918–1974), American journalist
Mary Rawlinson Creason (1924–1921), American aviator
Norwood Creason (1918–2009), American politician from Missouri
Sammy Creason (1944–1995), American percussionist
Todd E. Creason (born 1967), American writer